Stuart Holmes (born Joseph Liebchen; March 10, 1884 – December 29, 1971) was an American actor and sculptor whose career spanned seven decades. He appeared in almost 450 films between 1909 and 1964, sometimes credited as Stewart Holmes.

Biography
Holmes was born Joseph Liebchen on March 10, 1884, in Chicago, Illinois, where he was educated.

For 20 years, Holmes performed in vaudeville and on stage, with the latter often being in Shakespeare's plays. His work in the theater included a stint in Germany.

Holmes's film career began in 1911 and ended with The Man Who Shot Liberty Valance (1962).

As a sculptor Holmes created work for at least three California United States post offices — in Oceanside (1936), Claremont (1937), and Bell (1937).

Holmes's wife, Blanca, was an actress; his son, Phillips Holmes, was an actor.

Selected filmography

 The Woman Hater (1910, Short) as Carrol Morten
 Oliver Twist (1912)
 The Young Millionaire (1912)
 The Tell-Tale Message (1912)
 A Battle of Wits (1912)
 A Business Buccaneer (1912)
 The Game Warden (1913)
 The Fire Coward (1913)
 The Face at the Window (1913)
 The Pursuit of the Smugglers (1913)
 The Combination of the Safe (1914)
 The Celebrated Scandal (1915)
 The Clemenceau Case (1915)
 A Woman's Resurrection (1915)
 Should A Mother Tell? (1915)
 The Blindness of Devotion (1915)
 The Green-Eyed Monster (1916)
 East Lynne (1916)
 Under Two Flags (1916)
 The Witch (1916)
 Her Double Life (1916)
 Love and Hate (1916)
 Tangled Lives (1917)
 Love's Law (1917)
 Love Aflame (1917)
 The Wild Girl (1917)
 The Ghosts of Yesterday (1918)
 When Men Betray (1918)
 Treason (1918)
 The Poor Rich Man (1918)
 The New Moon (1919)
 The Way of a Woman (1919)
 The Other Man's Wife (1919)
 Trailed by Three (1920)
 Lifting Shadows (1920)
 The Evil Eye (1920)
 Passion Fruit (1921)
 No Woman Knows (1921)
 The Four Horsemen of the Apocalypse (1921)
 All's Fair in Love (1921)
 The Strangers' Banquet (1922)
 Her Husband's Trademark (1922)
 The Prisoner of Zenda (1922)
 Under Two Flags (1922)
 Paid Back (1922)
 The Scarlet Lily (1923)
 The Unknown Purple (1923)
 Daughters of the Rich (1923)
 Temporary Marriage (1923)
 Tipped Off (1923)
 Three Weeks (1924)
 On Time (1924)
 Between Friends (1924)
 Vanity's Price (1924)
 The Beloved Brute (1924)
 The Primrose Path (1925)
 The Salvation Hunters (1925)
 The Fighting Cub (1925)
 Friendly Enemies (1925)
 Steele of the Royal Mounted (1925)
 The Perfect Clown (1925)
 Three Keys (1925)
 Heir-Loons (1925)
 North Star (1925)
 Shadow of the Law (1926)
 Good and Naughty (1926)
 The Midnight Message (1926)
 Beyond the Trail (1926)
 The Hurricane (1926)
 Broken Hearts of Hollywood (1926)
 Duck Soup (1927)
 Polly of the Movies (1927)
 When a Man Loves (1927)
 Your Wife and Mine (1927)
 Burning Daylight (1928)
 The Hawk's Nest (1928)
 Should Tall Men Marry? (1928)
 Devil Dogs (1928)
 The Man Who Laughs (1928) as Lord Dirry-Moir
 The Cavalier (1928)
 Captain of the Guard (1930)
 Belle of the Nineties (1934)
 Bengal Tiger (1936)
 Hearts Divided (1936) 
 Penrod and Sam (1937)
 Jezebel (1938) as Doctor at Duel (uncredited)
 Devil's Island (1939)
 The Oklahoma Kid (1939) as President Grover Cleveland (uncredited)
 On Trial (1939)
 Affectionately Yours (1941)
 Yankee Doodle Dandy (1942)
 The Picture of Dorian Gray (1945) 
 The Ghost and Mrs. Muir (1947) as Man Ordered Out of Train Compartment by the Captain (uncredited)
 Street Corner (1948)
 Alias Nick Beal (1949) (uncredited)
 People Will Talk (1951) (uncredited) 
 Abbott and Costello Meet the Invisible Man (1953) 
 Remains to Be Seen (1953)
 Reprisal! (1956)
 The Nutty Professor (1963)
 Mary Poppins (1964)
 Youngblood Hawke (1964)

References

External links

 
 
 Stuart Holmes portrait
 Holmes' sculptures

1884 births
1971 deaths
20th-century American male actors
American male film actors
American male sculptors
American male silent film actors
American male stage actors
Male actors from Chicago
Vaudeville performers